Black Cadillac is Rosanne Cash's eleventh studio album, released on January 23, 2006. The album is dedicated to Cash's mother, Vivian Liberto, father, Johnny Cash, and stepmother, June Carter Cash, all of whom died at the age of 71 hence the 71-second silent track at the end. The album was nominated for a Grammy Award for Best Contemporary Folk album in 2007. This was Cash's last album for Capitol Records, a label Cash worked from 1996 to 2007. After that album's release, Cash left Capitol.

Track listing
All songs were written by Rosanne Cash, except where noted.
"Black Cadillac"
"Radio Operator" (Cash, John Leventhal)
"I Was Watching You"
"Burn Down This Town" (Cash, Leventhal)
"God Is in the Roses"
"House on the Lake" (Cash, Leventhal)
"The World Unseen"
"Like Fugitives
"Dreams Are Not My Home"
"Like a Wave"
"World Without Sound"
"The Good Intent" (Cash, Leventhal)
"0:71"

Musicians
Rosanne Cash: Vocals
Bill Bottrell: Guitars, 12-String Guitar, E-Bow Guitar, Mando Cello, Bouzouki, Background Vocals, E-Bow, Mixing
Benmont Tench: Organ, Wurlitzer Piano, Background Vocals
Bruce Fowler: Trombone
John Leventhal: Guitars, Bass, Dobro, Percussion, Mandolin, Keyboards, Piano, Producer, Engineer, Mixing
Shawn Pelton: Drums
Michael Rhodes: Bass
Kevin Breit: Mandolin, Acoustic Guitar
Catherine Russell: Harmony Vocal
Charley Drayton: Drums
Brian MacLeod: Drums, Background Vocals
Dan Schwartz: Bass, Background Vocals
Jose Hernandez: Trumpet
Albert Wing: Tenor Saxophone, Clarinet
Tom Gloadly, Joe Hogan, Mimi Parker: Engineering
Matt Shane: Mixing Assistant

Mastered by Ted Jensen

Chart performance

References

2006 albums
Rosanne Cash albums
Albums produced by Bill Bottrell
Albums produced by John Leventhal
Capitol Records albums
Country folk albums